Ezentis (formerly Avánzit) is a business group Seville based listed on the Madrid and Bilbao stock exchanges. It has over 50 years’ experience in the technology, infrastructure and telecommunications sectors.

The Group is organized into three main business areas: Ezentis Infraestructuras (technological infrastructure group), Ezentis Tecnologia (Information and Communications Technology), Ezentis Telecom (telecommunications). It also holds a stake in Vertice 360°, an audiovisual services company. The Group has a wide-ranging international presence in Latin America, the Caribbean, North Africa and Eastern Europe. With over 5000  employees across 3 continents, at international level the Group is working in various sectors, such as Telecommunications, Transport, Energy and Public Services and Civil Infrastructure (Civil works and building projects).

Financial Trouble 
On June 16 2022 the group announced that it was applying for €70 million from the rescue fund overseen by the state-run SEPI. At the same time the Managing Director José Elías Navarro announced his resignation after 11 days in the post.

Chairman 
 Mario Armero; January 2010 – September 2011
 Manuel Garcia-Duran; September 2011 – Present

Telecommunications companies of Spain